Carpathian Wooden Churches are religious structures made of wood and built in the Vernacular architecture of the Carpathians. These occur in the following areas:

 Wooden Churches of Southern Lesser Poland
 Wooden Churches of Maramureș in Romania
 Wooden Churches of Ukraine
 Wooden Churches of the Slovak Carpathians
 Wooden tserkvas of the Carpathian region in Poland and Ukraine

Wooden churches by country